The 1987 U.S. Figure Skating Championships took place in January 1987 at the Tacoma Dome in Tacoma, Washington. Medals were awarded in four colors: gold (first), silver (second), bronze (third), and pewter (fourth) in four disciplines – men's singles, ladies' singles, pair skating, and ice dancing – across three levels: senior, junior, and novice.

The event was one of the criteria used to select the U.S. teams for the 1987 World Championships.

Senior results

Men

Ladies

Pairs

Ice dancing

Junior results

Men

Ladies

Pairs

Ice dancing

Novice results

Men

Ladies

! 3
| Tarah Donelan
|}

Pairs

Ice dancing

References

External links
 Ladies' results
 Pairs' results

U.S. Figure Skating Championships
United States Figure Skating Championships, 1987
United States Figure Skating Championships, 1987
January 1987 sports events in the United States